Patricia Mary, Baroness Carson (5 March 1929, Oreston – 13 October 2014, Ghent) was an Anglo-Belgian historian and author.

Family
Patricia Carson was the daughter of Archibald-Stewart Carson and Hilde-Dorothy (née Clewlow) Carson. In 1954, she married Raoul Van Caenegem, historian and professor at the University of Ghent; the couple had two sons and a daughter.

Short Biography
Carson obtained a Bachelor in history at the University of London, followed by a Master of Arts (history) with a thesis on London in the 18th century. After her wedding, she lived permanently in Ghent and made her speciality of studying the relations between Great Britain and the Low Countries throughout the centuries. Her most successful book, many times reprinted, was The Fair Face of Flanders.

Honours
 The Eugène Baie Award 1977 (province of Antwerp) for the Fair Face of Flanders.
 On 8 July 1996, Patricia Carson Van Caenegem was made a member of the Belgian nobility, with the personal title of Baroness.

Publications

 "The Building of the first Bridge at Westminster", Journal of Transport History 3/2 (1957)
 Guide to Materials for West African History in the Archives of Belgium and Holland, London, 1962
 Guide to the Materials for West African History in French Archives, London, 1968.
 The Fair Face of Flanders, Ghent 1969, reprinted 1969, 3rd revised edition 1974, for which she received the Baie prize; with a Dutch translation in 1977, a German in 1982 and a Bulgarian in 1984. A French translation by Mady Buysse, Le Miroir de la Flandre, appeared in 1973.
 "The British Connection", Handelingen der Maatschappij voor Geschiedenis en Oudheidkunde te Gent, nieuwe reeks, 28 (1974); translated as "Britten en Vlamingen", Neerlandia, 1975, nr. 1; and "Vlaanderen en Nederland vanuit een Brits standpunt gezien", Ons Erfdeel, 13/3 (1970).
 With Gaby Danhieux:
 Ghent, a town for all seasons, Ghent 1972, translated as:
 Gent, een stad van alle tijden, 2nd ed., Ghent, 1977,
 Gand, ville de tous temps, Ghent 1972
 Gent, eine Stadt aus allen Zeiten, Ghent, 1975, illustrated by Godelieve de Schrijver.
 James Van Artevelde : The man from Ghent, 1980.
 Flanders in Creative Contrasts, 1989, translated by H. Brondeel as
 In Eindeloze Verscheidenheid: een historisch fresco van Vlaanderen, Lannoo and Davidsfonds.
 A new revised edition of The Fair Face of Flanders, in 4 languages including a new translation into Dutch was published in 1991 and republished in 1995 and 1997.
 A new revised Dutch edition of Gent, een stad van alle tijden, Lannoo, Tielt, 1992.
 A translation into Dutch by Marijke Brutsaert of James Van Artevelde, Davidsfonds, 1996.

References

1929 births
2014 deaths
Belgian baronesses
20th-century Belgian historians
Belgian women writers
20th-century English historians
English women writers
Historians of Belgium
British women historians